Tourism in Perth, the capital city of Western Australia, is an important part of the Australian state's economy, contributing to the prosperity of businesses in the city, as well as other regions of the state.

Perth had approximately 2.8 million domestic visitors and 0.7 million international visitors in the year ending March 2012.

Tourist information
Information about Perth and Western Australia has been in pamphlets and brochures traditionally. However, a considerable amount of information is now on the Internet with a range of promotional websites emanating from government and commercial organisations. Tourism Western Australia's web site is the main government tourist information entry pointwith information about Perth as the first part of the information.

Arts, culture and science

Perth city

The Perth Cultural Centre is an area of central Perth, Western Australia which includes the Art Gallery of Western Australia, the Western Australian Museum Perth, the State Library of Western Australia, and the Perth Institute of Contemporary Arts (PICA). A walkway connects the Cultural Centre to Perth railway station.

The Scitech Discovery Centre is an interactive science museum, with regularly changing exhibitions designed to inform and educate visitors on a large range of science and technology based subjects. Scitech also conducts live science shows, and operates the Horizon planetarium located next to the discovery centre.

West Australian Opera is the principal opera company of Western Australia, based at His Majesty's Theatre in Perth.

The West Australian Symphony Orchestra (WASO) is an Australian symphony orchestra based in Perth. Its concert venues include His Majesty's Theatre, the Perth Concert Hall, and the Riverside Theatre at the Perth Convention and Exhibition Centre, as well as other locations outside the city centre.

Fremantle
Fremantle Arts Centre is a multi-arts organisation, offering a program of exhibitions, residencies, art courses and music in a historic building in the heart of Fremantle, Western Australia. The building was built using convict labour between 1861 and 1868 and was used as a psychiatric hospital, initially called the Fremantle Lunatic Asylum, and later known as the Asylum for the Criminally Insane.

The Western Australian Maritime Museum, located on Victoria Quay contains galleries with maritime themes such as the Indian Ocean, the Swan River, fishing, maritime trade and naval defence. The Western Australian Museum's Shipwreck Galleries is also located in Fremantle, on nearby Cliff Street. It is a specialist maritime archaeology and shipwreck conservation museum, housed in 1850s-era Commissariat building. The Museum also maintains a "Museum-Without-Walls" program via its "wreck trail" and "wreck access" programs at Rottnest Island. These "trails" appear at many places along the coast.

The Army Museum of Western Australia is a museum located in an historic artillery barracks in Fremantle, Western Australia. The museum, established in 1977, consists of several galleries which reflects the Army's involvement in Western Australia and the military service of Western Australians from the colonial period through to the present day. The museum holds numerous items of significance, including three Victoria Crosses.

Metropolitan Perth
Zig Zag Cultural Centre is multi-purpose facility in Kalamunda that includes a visitor centre, art gallery, meeting facilities, and the Zig Zag Cafe. The centre opened on 17 September 2011, to draw visitors to the history, culture and attractions within the Shire of Kalamunda.

The Perth Observatory is an astronomical observatory in Bickley. It is Australia's oldest continuing operating observatory and Australia's only remaining State Government operated astronomical observatory.

The RAAF Association's Aviation Heritage Museum in Bull Creek houses aircraft and artefacts relating to Western Australia's aviation history. A Lancaster bomber is open for pre-booked guided tours and a stand-alone Merlin engine is run at midday every Saturday.

Landmarks and historical sites

Perth city
The city skyline features several prominent skyscrapers overlooking Perth Water, the wide but shallow section of the Swan River between Perth, South Perth, the Causeway, and the Narrows Bridge. Central Park Tower is the tallest building in Perth, and the ninth tallest building in Australia, whilst 108 St Georges Terrace has an unusual triangular cross-section. Brookfield Place incorporates a number of historic buildings in the precinct at its base.

Other modern buildings in the city include Council House, a restored high modernist office building set in the Stirling Gardens, and the Perth Convention and Exhibition Centre, Western Australia's only purpose-built convention centre that can cater for functions of up to 5000 delegates. 

Nearby, in the Elizabeth Quay precinct, are the Swan Bells. These are a set of twelve historic bells from St Martin-in-the-Fields church in Trafalgar Square in London, which hang together with six modern bells in a  copper and glass campanile, commonly known as The Bell Tower or the Swan Bell Tower.

Yagan Square connects Northbridge and the Perth CBD, with a  digital tower and the  statue "Wirin" designed by Noongar artist Tjyllyungoo.

The Northbridge Piazza is an outdoor area located at the corner of Lake Street and James Street, Northbridge. The Piazza features a stage, an outdoor LED screen operating 24 hours a day, and public artwork. It was designed for community use including performances, exhibitions, festivals, sporting events and other cultural activities.

There are several historical sites in Perth dating back to the 19th century.

Barracks Arch is the last remaining of The Barracks, originally built in 1866 to house the Enrolled Pensioner Force. That military unit was formed from the guards who came on convict ships. The Barracks was demolished in the 1960s to allow for the construction of the Mitchell Freeway immediately west of the arch. The arch was retained after public outcry despite the original intention to remove it as an obstruction to the view of Parliament House.

The Perth Town Hall, situated on the corner of Hay and Barrack streets, is the only town hall in Australia to be built by convicts, between 1868 and 1870. For many decades in the 20th century, shops were built into the sides of the ground floor, but the Town Hall was restored in the late 1990s, including the repair if the interior hall and the gothic arches at its base.

The Cathedral Square precinct includes the eponymous St George's Cathedral, Cadogan Song School, The Deanery, Burt Memorial Hall, Church House (containing the Anglican Diocese of Perth), City of Perth Library, the State Administrative Tribunal and the Public Trustee Building.

The Perth Mint is Australia's oldest operating mint, established in 1899 to mint gold sovereigns for the British Empire. The Mint remained under the jurisdiction of Britain until 1 July 1970, when it became a statutory authority of the Government of Western Australia. The Mint continues to service the gold industry, as well as manufacturing most of Australia's legal tender precious metal coins and many coin related numismatic items for investors and coin collectors.

Fremantle

The Round House, at Arthur Head, Fremantle, is the oldest building still standing in Western Australia. It built in 1830, and used as a prison for colonial and indigenous prisoners until 1886.

Fremantle Prison is a former Australian prison located in The Terrace, Fremantle. The prison was built by convict labour in the 1850s, and transferred to the colonial government in 1886 for use as a gaol for locally sentenced prisoners. It remained in operation as a prison until 1991. The historic site was retained, and is now a public museum, with daytime and night-time tours, as well as tours of the flooded tunnels and aqueducts under the prison.

Fremantle Town Hall is situated on the corner of High, William and Adelaide Streets, in Fremantle. It opened on 22 June 1887, coinciding with the celebration of Queen Victoria's Golden Jubilee.

The original Fremantle railway station, constructed in 1881 next to Cliff Street, Fremantle, was an important hub for gold miners arriving in Western Australia. In 1907 the station was moved to its present location on Elder Place to better service the newly constructed Fremantle Port. It was built in Federation Free Classical style, featuring a rare example of a large train hall roof.

Fremantle Fishing Boat Harbour is a commercial marina in Fremantle, Western Australia, that was constructed in 1919. It is the centre of a well established tourism precinct, including many restaurants, some of Australia's largest fish and chip shops, and a brewery immediately adjacent.

The Fremantle War Memorial is located on Monument Hill in Fremantle, and was established by the Fremantle Town Council in 1928 to commemorate the losses of the First World War. Further memorials have subsequently been added for those killed in other conflicts, and commemorative services are held yearly on Anzac Day (25 April) and Remembrance Day (11 November).

Metropolitan Perth

The Old Mill, also known as Shenton’s Mill, is a restored tower mill located on Mill Point in South Perth. It has been restored to its original 1830s condition, to serves as a historical attraction.

It was sealed in 1941, and secretly used as a radio antenna during World War II.

Crown Perth is located on the Swan River south-east of the city of Perth, Western Australia. The complex includes a casino, several restaurants and bars, a nightclub, two hotels, a convention centre, theatre and the Burswood Dome. The nearby Burswood railway station provides a public transport link to the Perth CBD.

Adventure World is a theme park located in Bibra Lake,  from the Perth CBD. The theme park contains many rides and attractions, including several which are water based, as well as a variety of food outlets.

It is situated in the Mundaring locality. The dam crosses the Helena River. The town of Mundaring was gazetted in 1898, the same year as the commencement of construction of the dam. There are many tourist facilities in the area, including Mundaring Weir Hotel and the C Y O'Connor Museum, as well as an outdoor cinema, youth hostel, art gallery, and many picnicking spots.

Nature and wildlife

Kings Park

Kings Park is a  park located on the western edge of the central business district in Perth, Western Australia. The park is a mixture of grassed parkland, botanical gardens and natural bushland on Mount Eliza with two thirds of the grounds conserved as native bushland. With panoramic views of the Swan River and Darling Range, it is home to over 300 native plant varieties and 80 bird species. It overlooks the city as well as Perth Water and Melville Water on the Swan River.
There are many landmarks and attractions within Kings Park.

State War Memorial Precinct

The State War Memorial Precinct is located on Mount Eliza overlooking Perth Water, and comprises the Cenotaph, Court of Contemplation, Flame of Remembrance and Pool of Reflection. It is visited by more than 40,000 people each Anzac Day, with a dawn service being held there each year. Distributed throughout the park are more specific memorials.

Western Australian Botanic Garden
The botanic garden is an  site within the park, with a collection of 2000 species of Western Australian flora on display. Botanic Garden is part of the worldwide network of botanic gardens committed to plant conservation. Also located within the botanic garden are the Conservation Garden, Gija Jumulu Boab Tree, Pioneer Women's Memorial Fountain and Water Garden, and the Lotterywest Federation Walkway

DNA Tower

Children's areas

The May Drive Parkland Parkland is one of two children's playgrounds in Kings Park, the other being the Ivey Watson Playground. It includes a lake and island, play and climbing equipment for children, and life-sized model dinosaurs. The Vietnam War memorial and a coffee shop and cafe are located in the May Drive Parkland.
Lotterywest Family Area is popular area for young families, and is specifically targeted for children aged under five. It was extensively refurbished in 2006 with funding from Lotterywest.

Jacob's Ladder
Jacob's Ladder is a set of stairs located at the end of Cliff Street, which marks the boundary of Kings Park. It has 242 steps and leads down to Mounts Bay Road, and is a popular place to exercise.

Perth Zoo

The Perth Zoo is a  zoo that opened in 1898 in South Perth, Western Australia. As of January 2011, it is home to 1258 animals of 164 species and includes an extensive botanical collection. The zoo has three main zones - Australian Walkabout, Asian Rainforest and African Savannah - as well as smaller exhibit areas.

Whiteman Park

Located within Whiteman Park are bushwalking trails, bike paths, sports facilities, playgrounds, a tram on a  circular track, motor and tractor museums, and Caversham Wildlife Park.

Lake Monger

Lake Monger is a large urban wetland located between suburban development in Leederville, Wembley and Glendalough. The  of lake and the surrounding parklands are known as the Lake Monger Reserve, and feature a 3.5 km paved walking/cycling track that encircles the lake, playground equipment and barbecue facilities.

Langley Park

Langley Park is an open space in the central business district of Perth, Western Australia. Running alongside Riverside Drive, it is grassed, rectangular in shape and has dimensions . It was created by reclaiming land from the adjacent Swan River between 1921 and 1935.

AQWA

The Aquarium of Western Australia (AQWA) is a privately owned aquarium in Hillarys, Western Australia. AQWA is Australia's largest aquarium, and the world's 10th largest Aquarium. The aquarium specializes in marine animals that inhabit the  western coast of Australia.

Rottnest Island

The island has many cycling tracks that connect to beaches and historical buildings.

Araluen Botanic Park

National parks

In the springtime there is a diverse range of wildflowers. Toilets, water, shaded areas and wood barbecues are available for use, however entry and camping fess apply.

It was the first national park in Western Australia. There are several walking trails within the national park, including along the former route of the Eastern Railway.

The park is noted for its caves, native bush and koala colonies. It also offers cultural educational programmes offered in partnership with the local Nyoongar aboriginal people.

Sunset Coast

Sunset Coast refers to the coastal section of the metropolitan Perth, north of the Swan Rivers. This includes Marmion Marine Park, a protected area inhabited by tropical fish, Australian Sea Lions, and Bottlenose Dolphins, and traversed by Humpback Whales. North of Marmion is Hillarys Boat Harbour, which includes Sorrento Quay and AQWA, the Aquarium of Western Australia). 
Cottesloe Beach hosts Sculpture by the Sea, an annual public exhibition of sculptures. Tourist Drive 204, also known as Sunset Coast Tourist Drive, is a designated route from North Fremantle to Iluka along existing coastal roads.

Heirisson Island 

Heirisson Island is located in the Swan River, between East Perth and Victorias Park suburbs, under Causeway elevated street. It has a protected area inhabited by Kangaroos, Ducks and other birds. It is open for people to walk or ride their bicycles into the area. in 2017, there are at least 5 western grey kangaroos. 
Outside the protected area there are places for other amenities as well such as the picnic, fishing and barbecue places. Dogs and pets are also allowed in this area.
Walking all way to the end of Causeway street in East Perth location, you can find some restaurants facing the Swan River, bike & kayak renting services, swan river boat tours and a children's park.

Shopping

Shops in Perth CBD

Retail shopping in the Perth CBD is focused around Murray Street and Hay Street. Both of these streets are pedestrian malls between William Street and Barrack Street. Forrest Place is another pedestrian mall that connects the Murray Street Mall to Wellington Street and the Perth railway station. The Forrest Chase shopping centre, which features major retailer Myer, is located on the east side of Forrest Place, between the Murray Street mall and Wellington Street, and incorporates a pedestrian bridge over Wellington Street for direct access to Perth railway station. A number of arcades run between Hay Street and Murray Street, including the Piccadilly Arcade, which houses the Piccadilly Cinema.

Watertown

Watertown Perth is located on Wellington Street in West Perth and features around 120 specialty stores, which are predominantly factory outlets for major brands.

Fremantle Markets

The Fremantle Markets are a public market located on the corner of South Terrace and Henderson Street, Fremantle, Western Australia.
Built in 1897, the markets house over 150 shops for craftspeople, fashion designers, and merchants in the historic Hall, and fresh food producers, vegetable growers and food retailers in The Yard.

Joondalup

Joondalup's central business district, centred on Grand Boulevard, is largely a shopping and retail area lined with townhouses and apartments. Lakeside Joondalup is located adjacent to the Joondalup railway station and backs onto Grand Boulevard. The centre contains three supermarkets, three large discount variety stores, a cinema, and numerous smaller shops.
Joondalup was granted the status of "tourism precinct" by the State Government in 2009, allowing for extended retail trading hours.

Midland

Midland's townsite is based around both Great Eastern Highway, which carries east bound traffic, and Victoria Street, which carries westbound traffic. Development was initially around the historic Town Hall and Post Office buildings, constructed in 1906 and 1913 respectively, however the modern focus is around the Midland Gate shopping centre further east. The centre features two supermarkets, three large discount variety stores, a cinema, and numerous smaller shops.

Food and wine

Swan Valley

The Swan Valley is noted for its fertile soil, uncommon in the Perth region, and features numerous wineries such as the large complex at Houghtons, the state's biggest producer, Sandalfords and many smaller operators, including microbreweries and rum distilleries. The Swan Valley also contains specialised food producers, and many restaurants and cafes. Roadside local-produce stalls sell seasonal fruit throughout the year. Tourist Drive 203 is a circular route in the Swan Valley, passing by many attractions on West Swan Road and Great Northern Highway.

See also
 Tourism in Australia
 Islands of Perth, Western Australia

Notes

References

External links

 Tourism Western Australia
 Perth - Tourism Australia

Tourism in Perth, Western Australia